The Melkite Greek Catholic Patriarchal Dependent Territory of Jerusalem (Latin: Hierosolymitana Melchitarum) is a branch of the Melkite Greek Catholic Church immediately subject to the Patriarch of Antioch of the Melkites. Yasser Ayyash is the current Vicar Apostolic of the Patriarch Youssef Absi.

References

External links
 http://www.pgc-lb.org/fre/melkite_greek_catholic_church/Jerusalem-Sieges-Patriarcaux

Melkite Greek Catholic eparchies
Melkite Greek Catholic Church in Israel
Eastern Catholicism in the State of Palestine
Catholic Church in Jerusalem